Maccarae or Makkarai was a town in ancient Thessaly in the territory of Pharsalus.

It is tentatively located near the modern Arabises.

References

Populated places in ancient Thessaly
Former populated places in Greece
Thessaliotis